The 1915 Copa de Honor Cousenier was the final match to decide the winner of the Copa de Honor Cousenier, the 10th. edition of the international competition organised by the Argentine and Uruguayan Associations together. The final was contested by Uruguayan Club Nacional de Football and Argentine Racing Club de Avellaneda. 

The match was held in the Estadio Gran Parque Central in Montevideo, on November 14, 1915. Nacional beat Racing 3–2, winning its third Copa Cousenier trophy.

Qualified teams 

Note

Match details 

|

|}

Notes

References

c
c
1915 in Argentine football
1915 in Uruguayan football